This is a list of colonial Residents of Dutch Timor from the mid-seventeenth century to decolonization in 1949. Colonial rivalry on Timor between the Dutch East India Company (VOC) and the Portuguese began in 1613, conditioned by the desire to control the sandalwood trade in the region. The Dutch were permanently established on the island Solor, to the north of Timor, from 1646. In 1653 they founded a fortress in Kupang in West Timor, Fort Concordia, and made it their main regional base in 1657. The fortress was headed by a colonial Resident who, during the VOC era, carried the name opperhoofd. The territory controlled by the VOC on Timor was originally restricted to the vicinity of Kupang, the so-called sespalen gebied. After 1749 large parts of West Timor fell under Dutch suzerainty, although attempts to subjugate areas in East Timor were thwarted by 1761. The VOC was dissolved in 1799 and replaced by a new colonial organization under the Batavian Republic. Fort Concordia capitulated to the British in January 1812 and stood under British rule until 1816 when it was returned to the new Kingdom of the Netherlands. Agreements with the Portuguese in 1851 and 1859 established the borders between Dutch and Portuguese Timor. In the late colonial period the Residency of Timor and Dependencies (Timor en Onderhoorigheden) consisted of West Timor, Roti, Savu, Sumbawa, Flores, the Solor Islands, and the Alor Islands. The Dutch administration was ousted through the Japanese attack in 1942. The Dutch, assisted by a force from Australia returned in the fall of 1945. During the Indonesian Revolution in 1945-49 there was widespread republican and anti-colonial agitation, but no physical fighting. The last Dutch Resident A. Verhoef handed over his powers to a new Indonesian administration in late 1949.

List of Residents

 Hendrick Hendricksz van Oldenburgh (on Solor), 1646-1648
 Hendrick ter Horst (on Solor), 1648–1654
 Jacob Verheyden (on Solor), 1654-1655
 Cornelis Ockersz (on Solor, acting), 1655
 Hendrick ter Horst (on Solor until 1657), 1655-1659
 Joseph Margits, 1659-1660
 Johan Truytman (commissioner), 1660
 Hugo Cuylenburgh, 1660-1665
 Anthony Hurt, 1665-1667
 Jacob Pietersz van den Kerper, 1667-1670
 Jacob Lidema (acting), 1670-1672
 Jacob van Wijckersloot, 1672-1680
 Joannes van den Broeck, 1681-1683
 Willem Tange (acting) 1683-1684
 Jan van Heden 1684-1684
 Willem Tange, 1684-1685
 Gerrit Hoofd, 1685-1686
 Willem Moerman, 1686-1687
 Arend Verhoeven 1687
 Willem Moerman, 1687-1698
 François van den Eynde, 1698
 Willem Moerman, 1698-1699
 Joan Focanus, 1699-1702
 Joannes van Alphen, 1702-1706
 Didloff Blad, 1706-1712
 Reynier Leers, 1712-1714
 Isaac Marmer, 1714
 Leendert Grim (acting), 1714-1715
 Willem van Putten, 1715-1717
 Barend van der Swaan, 1717-1721
 Hendrick Engelert, 1721-1725
 Balthazar de Moucheron, 1725-1728
 Steven Palm (acting), 1728-1729
 Anthony Hurt, 1729-1730
 Gerardus Bernardus Visscher, 1730-1736
 Aart Jansz Peper, 1736-1739
 Pieter Jacob Blok, 1739
 Aart Jansz Peper, 1739-1740
 Jan Dinnies, 1740-1740
 Christiaan Fredrik Brandenburg (acting), 1740-1741
 Anthony Cornelis van Oldenbarnevelt (Tulling), 1741-1742
 Christiaan Fredrik Brandenburg (acting), 1742-1744
 Jan Anthony Meulenbeek, 1744-1746
 Gilles Jacob Helmmuts (acting), 1746-1747
 Johannes Steenwegh (acting), 1747-1747/48
 Daniel van der Burgh, 1748-1754
 Elias Jacob Beynon, 1754-1758
 Johannes Andreas Paravicini (commissioner), 1756
 Hans Albrecht von Plüskow, 1758-1761
 Johan Willem Erland Daniel ter Herbruggen, 1762-1765
 Bartholomeus van Voorst, 1765-1766
 Willem Adriaan van Este (acting), 1766-1767
 Alexander Cornabé, 1767-1772
 Barend Willem Fokkens, 1772-1777
 Willem Adriaan van Este, 1777-1789
 Timotheus Wanjon, 1789-1797
 Carel Gratus Greving, 1797-1799
 George Simon Gotthelft Doser (commissioner), 1799-1800
 Hans Andries Lofsteth (commissioner), 1800-1802
 Johannes Giesler, 1802-1803
 Frans Philip Christiaan Kurtzen (acting), 1803-1804
 Pieter Bernardus van Kruijne, 1804-1807
 Frans Philip Christiaan Kurtzen (acting), 1807
 Pieter Stopkerb, 1807-1810
 Jacobus Arnoldus Hazaart, 1810-1812
 Cornelis Willem Knibbe (under British rule), 1812
 Watson (under British rule), 1812
 Joseph Burn (under British rule), 1812-1814
 Curtois (under British rule, acting), 1814
 Jacobus Arnoldus Hazaart (under British rule until 1816), 1814–18
 M. Haleweijn (acting), 1818-1819
 Jacobus Arnoldus Hazaart, 1819-1832
 Emanuel A. Francis (commissioner) 1831-32
 Johan Baptist Spanoghe, 1833-1835
 Carel Frederik Goldman, 1835-1836
 Diderik Johan van den Dungen Gronovius, 1836-1841
 Cornelis Sluyter, 1841-1844
 Siegfried George Friedrich Fraenkel, 1844-1845
 Cornelis Sluyter, 1845-1848
 Dirk Wouter Jacob Carel, Baron van Lynden, 1849-1852
 Frederik Marie Gerard van Cattenburch (acting), 1852
 Jhr. Theodoor van Capellen, 1852-1856
 Siegfried George Friedrich Fraenkel, 1856-1858
 Johannes Grudelbach, 1858-1859
 Willem Leendert Hendrik Brocx, 1859-1861
 Isaac Esser (acting), 1861-1863
 Roelof Wijnen, 1863-1864
 Jan George Coorengel, 1864-1869
 Johan Arnoud Caspersz, 1869-1872
 Jan Karel de Wit, 1872-1873
 Hendrik Carel Humme, 1873-1875
 Charles Matthieu George Arinus Marinus Ecoma Verstege, 1875-1878
 Johann Gerard Friedrich Riedel, 1878-1880
 Willem Fredrik Sikman, 1880-1881
 Salomon Roos, 1882-1884
 W. Greve, 1884-1888
 Guillaume Gérard de Villeneuve, 1888-1890
 Willem Cornelis Hoogkamer, 1890-1893
 Cornelis Marius Eduard Merens, 1893-1895
 J. L. J. A. Ruijssenaers, 1895
 J. van Wijck, 1896-1898
 Fokko Fokkens (acting), 1898-1899
 Johannes Vijzelaar, 1899-1902
 Frits Anton Heckler, 1902-1905
 Johannes Frederikus Antonius de Rooy, 1906-1908
 E. F. J. Loriaux, 1908-1911
 C. H. van Rieschoten, 1911-1913
 Ernst Gustav Theodoor Maier, 1913-1917
 K. A. James, 1917-1918
 Anthony Hendrik Spaan, 1918-1921
 A. J. L. Couvreur, 1921-1924
 C. Schultz 1924-1927
 Paulus Franciscus Josephus Karthaus, 1927-1931
 Eugene Henri de Nijs Bik, 1931-1934
 Johan Jacob Bosch, 1934-1938
 Fokko Jan Nieboer, 1938-1942
 Cornelis Woutherus Schüller, 1945-1948
 A. Verhoef, 1948-1949

See also
 List of colonial governors of Portuguese Timor
 List of rulers of Timor
 History of Timor
 Kupang

References

Dutch colonial governors and administrators

East Nusa Tenggara